Simon Walker (born in Sydney, NSW 1961 – June 2010) was an Australian composer of numerous film and television soundtracks including For the Term of His Natural Life.  The first available soundtrack of his music was of his score for The Wild Duck on Southern Cross Records, and other releases include The Last of the Mohicans and his AFI Award-nominated score for Annie's Coming Out on the 1M1 Records label.

Early life 
Having met recording producer Philip Powers in 1980, they collaborated in 1988 to conceive 1M1 Records, an Australian record label dedicated to Australian Music CD releases with a focus on Australian film soundtrack recordings. The first project was of Walker's own score to the Australian TV miniseries, For the Term of His Natural Life.

Career

Classical Compositions
Two of Walker's contemporary classical compositions, the Bartokesque Binary and Deep Space were released on the compact disc Music for Pianos, Percussion and Synthesizers.  This was a concept album designed by Walker and Powers to explore the territory of synthesizers to the extent they could be utilised since their inception up to 1989.  The four other Australian film composers who wrote works for this album were Guy Gross, Philip Powers, Mark Isaacs and Chris Neal.

The Sydney Morning Herald classical music critic, Roger Covell, wrote in his review in 1990 that "Walker's 'Binary' has a feeling of severity and power to it... The disc is a useful message from composers who are in the process of working out their place in Australian music. More messages of a similar kind would be welcome."

G.P. theme
His theme for the ABC series G.P., performed by the Tasmanian Symphony Orchestra, has arguably become his most familiar piece of music in the film industry and was a highly recognisable Australian themes in the 1990s. It is based on the theme in the third movement of Haydn's Trumpet Concerto.

References

External links 

 

1961 births
2010 deaths